Badruddin Khan (born 4 June 1968) is an Indian cricketer. He played in 37 first-class and 18 List A matches for Assam and Mumbai between 1986 and 1999. In February 2020, he was named in India's squad for the Over-50s Cricket World Cup in South Africa. However, the tournament was cancelled during the third round of matches due to the COVID-19 pandemic.

References

External links
 

1968 births
Living people
Indian cricketers
Assam cricketers
Mumbai cricketers
Place of birth missing (living people)